Piranjuq (also Romanized as Pīrānjūq; also known as Pīr Ānjokh) is a village in Sumay-ye Jonubi Rural District, Sumay-ye Beradust District, Urmia County, West Azerbaijan Province, Iran. At the 2006 census, its population was 632, in 107 families.

References 

Populated places in Urmia County